Jiří Tabák (born 8 August 1955) is a retired Czech gymnast. He competed at the 1976 and 1980 Summer Olympics in all artistic gymnastics events and finished in ninth and sixth place with the Czechoslovak team, respectively. Individually he won a bronze medal in the rings and finished fourth in the floor exercise in 1980.  Additionally, he is a three-time European individual medalist, including one championship title on Vault, which he won in 1977.

References

1955 births
Living people
Gymnasts at the 1976 Summer Olympics
Gymnasts at the 1980 Summer Olympics
Olympic gymnasts of Czechoslovakia
Olympic bronze medalists for Czechoslovakia
Olympic medalists in gymnastics
Czech male artistic gymnasts
Czechoslovak male artistic gymnasts
Sportspeople from Karviná
Medalists at the 1980 Summer Olympics